Deadline Hollywood, commonly known as Deadline and also referred to as Deadline.com, is an online news site founded as the news blog Deadline Hollywood Daily by Nikki Finke in 2006. The site is updated several times a day, with entertainment industry news as its focus. It has been a brand of Penske Media Corporation since 2009.

History
Deadline was founded by Nikki Finke, who began writing an LA Weekly column series called Deadline Hollywood in June 2002. She began the Deadline Hollywood Daily (DHD) blog in March 2006 as an online version of her column. She officially launched it as an entertainment trade website in 2006. The site became one of Hollywood's most followed websites by 2009. In 2009, Finke sold Deadline to Penske Media Corporation (then Mail.com Media) for a low-seven-figure sum. Finke was also given a five-year-plus employment contract reported by the Los Angeles Times as being worth "millions of dollars", as well as part of the site's revenue. In September 2009, the URL was changed to deadline.com and the site's name became Deadline Hollywood.

The publication expanded to New York in 2010 with the hiring of Variety reporter Mike Fleming Jr. as the new Deadline New York editor, Financial Times editor Tim Adler to lead Deadline London, and Nellie Andreeva for the site's television coverage as "co-editors-in-chief, TV". Finke remained the editor of Deadline Hollywood until November 2013, when she left after a year-long disagreement between herself and Penske, which had bought Variety, a competing trade magazine and website.

References

External links
 
 Deadline Hollywood at PMC

2009 establishments in the United States
American entertainment news websites
Entertainment trade magazines
Internet properties established in 2009
Penske Media Corporation